Fernando Samayoa (born 15 October 1989) is a Mexican manager and a former player who is the manager for Atlético de San Luis Femenil since 2021.

Club career
Díaz played his first game in 2011 with Hermosillo.

Coaching career
In 2018, Díaz became the manager for Atlas.

In 2022, Díaz was named the coach for Atlético San Luis.

References

External links
 
 

1989 births
Living people
Mexican football managers
Liga MX Femenil managers
People from Guadalajara, Jalisco